Shiroky Priluk is a rural locality (a settlement) in Vilegodsky District, Arkhangelsk Oblast, Russia. The population was 468 as of 2010. There are 11 streets.

Geography 
Shiroky Priluk is located 60 km east of Ilyinsko-Podomskoye (the district's administrative centre) by road.

References 

Rural localities in Vilegodsky District